Cesare e Cleopatra is a dramma per musica in three acts by composer Carl Heinrich Graun. The opera uses an Italian-language libretto by Giovan Gualberto Bottarelli.

Performances
It was commissioned by Frederick II of Prussia for the opening of the newly built Königliches Opernhaus (Royal Opera House) in Berlin, and was notably the inaugural performance of the newly formed Berlin State Opera.

Although construction of the opera house was not entirely complete, the opera premiered in the new theatre using a German language translation on 7 December 1742 under the baton of the composer. The production starred soprano Maria Giovanna Gasparini as Cleopatra VII and castrato Paolo Bedeschi as Julius Caesar.

Recordings
 1992 on the Serenissima label (360171), live: Jacobs/Williams-J/Dawson/Beronesi/Popken/Francis/Rayam/Trekel
 1995 on the HM label (mis-titled "Cleopatra e Cesare"): René Jacobs; Janet Williams (Cleopatra), Iris Vermillion (Cesare), Lynne Dawson (Cornelia), Robert Gambill (Tolomeo), Ralf Popken (Arsace), Jeffrey Francis (Lentulo), Klaus Häger (Achilla), Elisabeth Scholl (Cneo), María Cristina Kiehr (Sesto). RIAS Kammerchor, Concerto Köln. Recorded Jesus-Christus-Kirche, Berlin-Dahlem April–May 1995.
 2017 on the Sony label: Cleopatra e Cesare, WV B:I:7: Tra le procelle assorto (Aria) · Regula Mühlemann · Carl Heinrich Graun · La Folia Barockorchester · Robin Peter Müller

References

1742 operas
Italian-language operas
Operas
Operas by Carl Heinrich Graun
Opera world premieres at the Berlin State Opera
Depictions of Cleopatra in opera
Depictions of Julius Caesar in opera